Talose is an aldohexose sugar.  It is an unnatural monosaccharide that is soluble in water and slightly soluble in methanol. Some etymologists suggest that talose's name derives from the automaton of Greek mythology named Talos, but the relevance is unclear.

Talose is a C-2 epimer of galactose and a C-4 epimer of mannose.

References

Aldohexoses